"Holding On for Life" is a song performed by American alternative rock band Broken Bells. Written by band members James Mercer and Brian Burton and produced by the latter, the song was originally recorded for the band's second studio album, After the Disco, on which it appears as the third track. It was released as the album's lead single on November 21, 2013. The song is featured in the soundtrack for the video game MLB 14: The Show.

Reception
Kory Grow of Rolling Stone described the song as "a Bee Gees-like indie-disco number," a sentiment also expressed by NPR's Bob Boilen, who wrote that he "heard Bee Gees in something like this." In an interview with Boilen, Danger Mouse concurred with this comparison, saying, "It sounded kind of like the Bee Gees a little bit, but so what? The Bee Gees had some good choruses."

Music video
A music video for the song was directed by Jacob Gentry, and stars Kate Mara and Anton Yelchin. The video serves as a sequel to the previously released video for the song "Angel and the Fool", also from After the Disco.

Charts

Weekly charts

Year-end charts

References

External links
 

Broken Bells songs
2013 singles
Columbia Records singles
2013 songs
Songs written by Danger Mouse (musician)
Songs written by James Mercer (musician)
Song recordings produced by Danger Mouse (musician)